Evelyn Sears won the singles tennis title of the 1907 U.S. Women's National Singles Championship by defeating Carrie Neely 6–3, 6–2 in the final of the All Comers' tournament. Helen Homans was the reigning champion but did not defend her title in the Challenge Round. The event was played on outdoor grass courts and held at the Philadelphia Cricket Club in Wissahickon Heights, Chestnut Hill, Philadelphia from June 25 through July 2, 1907.

Draw

All Comers' finals

References

1907
1907 in women's tennis
June 1907 sports events
1907 in American women's sports
Women's Singles
Chestnut Hill, Philadelphia
1900s in Philadelphia
1907 in sports in Pennsylvania
Women's sports in Pennsylvania